Silvia Vives Montlleó (born August 17, 1974, in Barcelona) is an S8 swimmer from Spain.  She has a disability and is an S8-type swimmer. She competed at the 1996 Summer Paralympics, winning a silver medal in the 100-meter butterfly race and silver in the 100-meter backstroke race. She won a bronze medal in the 4 x 100-meter 34 points medley relay and the 200-meter individual medley.

References 

Living people
1974 births
Spanish female backstroke swimmers
Spanish female breaststroke swimmers
Spanish female medley swimmers
Paralympic silver medalists for Spain
Paralympic bronze medalists for Spain
Swimmers from Barcelona
Swimmers at the 1992 Summer Paralympics
Swimmers at the 1996 Summer Paralympics
Paralympic medalists in swimming
Medalists at the 1992 Summer Paralympics
Medalists at the 1996 Summer Paralympics
Paralympic swimmers of Spain
S8-classified Paralympic swimmers
Medalists at the World Para Swimming Championships
20th-century Spanish women